Nebria cordicollis kochi is a subspecies of ground beetle in the Nebriinae subfamily that is endemic to Italy.

References

cordicollis kochi
Beetles described in 1940
Beetles of Europe
Endemic fauna of Italy